Rodrigo Vergilio, better known as Careca or Rodrigo (born 13 April 1983), is a Brazilian football striker who currently plays for São Bernardo.

Careca previously played for Cerezo Osaka in the J2 League.
Careca signed with Al Qadsia in Kuwaiti Premier League, but the deal fell through soon after. In December 2015 it was announced that Careca would be joining Chonburi for the 2016 season.

Club statistics

References

External links

1983 births
Living people
Brazilian footballers
Brazilian expatriate footballers
Expatriate footballers in Japan
Expatriate footballers in Kuwait
Expatriate footballers in Thailand
Ventforet Kofu players
Thespakusatsu Gunma players
Cerezo Osaka players
Shonan Bellmare players
Royal Thai Navy F.C. players
Chonburi F.C. players
J2 League players
Al-Nasr SC (Dubai) players
Al-Nasr SC (Kuwait) players
Al-Shaab CSC players
Dubai CSC players
Dibba FC players
Brazilian expatriate sportspeople in Japan
Brazilian expatriate sportspeople in Kuwait
Brazilian expatriate sportspeople in Thailand
Brazilian expatriate sportspeople in the United Arab Emirates
UAE First Division League players
UAE Pro League players
Thai League 1 players
Associação Atlética Flamengo players
Association football forwards
Qadsia SC players
Kuwait Premier League players